Dravet syndrome, previously known as severe myoclonic epilepsy of infancy (SMEI), is an autosomal dominant genetic disorder which causes a catastrophic form of epilepsy, with prolonged seizures that are often triggered by hot temperatures or fever. It is very difficult to treat with anticonvulsant medications. It often begins before 1 year of age, with 6 months being the age that seizures, characterized by prolonged convulsions and triggered by fever, usually begin.

Signs and symptoms
Dravet syndrome has been characterized by prolonged febrile and non-febrile seizures within the first year of a child's life. This disease progresses to other seizure types like myoclonic and partial seizures, psychomotor delay, and ataxia. It is characterized by cognitive impairment, behavioural disorders, and motor deficits. Behavioural deficits often include hyperactivity and impulsiveness, and in more rare cases, autistic-like behaviours. Dravet syndrome is also associated with sleep disorders including somnolence and insomnia.  The seizures experienced by people with Dravet syndrome become worse as the patient ages, as the disease is not very observable when symptoms first appear. This coupled with the range of severity differing between each individual diagnosed and the resistance of these seizures to drugs has made it challenging to develop treatments.

Dravet syndrome appears during the first year of life, often beginning around six months of age with frequent febrile seizures (fever-related seizures). Children with Dravet syndrome typically experience a lagged development of language and motor skills, hyperactivity and sleep difficulties, chronic infection, growth and balance issues, and difficulty relating to others. The effects of this disorder do not diminish over time, and children diagnosed with Dravet syndrome require fully committed caretakers with tremendous patience and the ability to closely monitor them.

Febrile seizures are divided into two categories known as simple and complex. A febrile seizure would be categorized as complex if it has occurred within 24 hours of another seizure or if it lasts longer than 15 minutes. A febrile seizure lasting less than 15 minutes would be considered simple. Sometimes modest hyperthermic stressors like physical exertion or a hot bath can provoke seizures in affected individuals. However, any seizure uninterrupted after 5 minutes, without a resumption of postictal (more normal; recovery-type; after-seizure) consciousness can lead to potentially fatal status epilepticus.

Causes
In most cases the mutations in Dravet syndrome are not hereditary and the mutated gene is found for the first time in a single family member. In 70–90% of patients, Dravet syndrome is caused by nonsense mutations in the SCN1A gene resulting in a premature stop codon and thus a non-functional protein.  This gene normally codes for neuronal voltage-gated sodium channel Nav1.1. In mouse models, these loss-of-function mutations have been observed to result in a decrease in sodium currents and impaired excitability of GABAergic interneurons of the hippocampus. The researchers found that loss of Nav1.1 channels was sufficient to cause the epilepsy and premature death seen in Dravet syndrome.

The timing of the first signs and symptoms in Dravet syndrome occur about the same time as normal childhood vaccinations, leading some to believe the vaccine was the cause. However, this is likely a non-specific response to fever, as vaccination often induces fever, and fever is known to be associated with seizures in persons with Dravet syndrome.  Some of the patients who put forth vaccine injury claims from encephalopathy were later found, upon testing, to actually have Dravet syndrome.

Genetics
The genotypic explanation of the disorder has been located on the specific voltage-gated sodium channel genes known as SCN1A and SCN2A. These genes are located on the long (q) arm of chromosome 2 at position 24.3 and code for the alpha subunit of the transmembrane sodium channel protein. A mutation in either of these two genes will cause an individual to develop dysfunctional sodium channels, which are crucial in the pathway for sending chemical signals in the brain, causing the phenotypic display of myoclonic epilepsy from the individual. A properly functioning channel would respond to a voltage difference across the membrane and form a pore through which only sodium ions can pass. The influx of sodium induces the generation of action potential by temporarily changing the charge of the cell. When the gene is mutated, the eventually translated protein improperly folds its pore segment within the cell membrane because it has different amino acid chemistry, which renders the channel inactive. It is also possible for a mutation to reduce the number of channels produced by an individual, which leads to the development of Dravet syndrome.

Currently, the SCN1A gene is the most clinically relevant; the largest number of epilepsy related mutations characterized thus far occur in this gene. Typically, a missense mutation in either the S5 or S6 segment of the sodium channel pore results in a loss of channel function and the development of Dravet syndrome. A heterozygous inheritance of an SCN1A mutation is all that is necessary to develop a defective sodium channel; patients with Dravet syndrome will still have one normal copy of the gene.

Diagnosis
According to the Dravet Syndrome Foundation, the diagnostic criteria for DS requires the patient to present with several of the following symptoms:
 Onset of seizures in the first year of life in an otherwise healthy infant
 Initial seizures are typically prolonged and are generalized or unilateral
 Presence of other seizure types (i.e. myoclonic seizures)
 Seizures associated with fever due to illness or vaccinations
 Seizures induced by prolonged exposure to warm temperatures
 Seizures in response to strong lighting or certain visual patterns
 Initially normal EEGs and later EEGs with slowing and severe generalized polyspikes
 Normal initial development followed by slow development during the first few years of life
 Some degree of hypotonia
 Unstable gait and balance issues
 Ankle pronation and flat feet and/or development of a crouched gait with age

Treatment
Seizures in Dravet syndrome can be difficult to manage but may be reduced by anticonvulsant medications such as clobazam, stiripentol, topiramate and valproate. Because the course of the disorder varies from individual to individual,  treatment protocols may vary. A diet high in fats and low in carbohydrates may also be beneficial, known as a ketogenic diet. Although diet adjustment can help, it does not eliminate the symptoms. Until a better form of treatment or cure is discovered, those with this disease will have myoclonic epilepsy for the rest of their lives.

Certain anticonvulsant medications that are classed as sodium channel blockers are now known to make seizures worse in most Dravet patients. These medications include carbamazepine, gabapentin, lamotrigine, and phenytoin.

Treatments include cognitive rehabilitation through psychomotor and speech therapy. In addition, valproate is often administered to prevent recurrence of febrile seizures and a benzodiazepine is used for long lasting seizures, but these treatments are usually insufficient.

Stiripentol was the only medication for which a double-blind placebo-controlled randomized controlled trial was performed and this medication showed efficacy in trials. It acts as a GABAergic agent and as a positive allosteric modulator of GABAA receptor. Stiripentol, can improve focal refractory epilepsy, as well as Dravet's syndrome, supplemented with clobazam and valproate was approved in Europe in 2007 as a therapy for Dravet syndrome and has been found to reduce overall seizure rate by 70%. In cases with more drug-resistant seizures, topiramate and the ketogenic diet are used as alternative treatments. A Cochrane review first published in 2014 and updated 2022 called for larger, randomized, well controlled trials to be able to draw conclusions.

Cannabidiol (CBD) was approved in United States for treatment of Dravet syndrome in 2018. A 2017 study showed that the frequency of seizures per month decreased from 12 to 6 with the use of cannabidiol, compared with a decrease from 15 to 14 with placebo.

In 2020, fenfluramine was approved for the medical treatment in the European Union and the USA.

Epidemiology
Dravet syndrome is a severe form of epilepsy, responsible for roughly 10% of cases in children. It is a rare genetic disorder that affects an estimated 1 in every 20,000–40,000 births.

COVID-19
Although it is not clear whether people with Dravet syndrome are specially vulnerable to COVID-19 infection, recent publications have shown that affected individuals and their families have suffered some indirect consequences during the COVID-19 pandemic, such as healthcare barriers, loss of therapies or economic issues.

History
Charlotte Dravet first described severe myoclonic epilepsy of infancy in Centre Saint Paul, Marseille, France in 1978 and the name was later changed to Dravet syndrome in 1989. Similar descriptions were given by Bernardo Dalla Bernardina in Verona.

Charlotte Figi, who was diagnosed as having Dravet syndrome, was the focus of a cause célèbre to provide a means for use of cannabidiol for persons with intractable seizures. She died from pneumonia, possibly caused by COVID-19, in April, 2020.

References

External links 

Epilepsy
Neurological disorders in children
Disorders causing seizures
Rare syndromes
Syndromes affecting the nervous system
Syndromes with intellectual disability